Rosebud Battlefield State Park in Big Horn County, Montana preserves a large portion of the battlefield of the Battle of the Rosebud, fought on June 17, 1876. The battle is known by various other names such as The Battle Where the Girl Saved Her Brother by the Northern Cheyenne, and Crook's Fight on the Rosebud. A National Historic Landmark, the park is a day use facility offering hiking, hunting, picnicking and wildlife viewing.

Setting

Rosebud Battlefield State Park is located in a rural setting of Big Horn County, Montana, southeast of Billings and just east of the Northern Cheyenne Indian Reservation. It is located west of Montana Highway 314, in an area of rolling prairie characterized by numerous ridges.  Immediately to the south of the battlefield is a mesa, below which Rosebud Creek meanders in a generally easterly direction.

The park has an information kiosk and vault toilet at its entrance, and a rough gravel road traverses around the main battlefield area, but is otherwise undeveloped.

History

The Battle of the Rosebud, fought on June 17, 1876, marked a turning point in the Great Sioux War of 1876, in which the United States sought to force Native American tribes in the region onto reservations.  United States Army forces under the command of General George Crook were attacked here by a mixed force of Lakota Sioux and Cheyenne commanded by Crazy Horse, stopping an advance that was part of an intended three-pronged movement against Native villages in Bighorn area.  Over a six-hour period, the battle extended across a nearly  area along Rosebud Creek.  It was tactically a stalemate, but Crook failed to make the planned rendezvous and withdrew from the theater of war, ultimately leaving General George Armstrong Custer exposed to defeat at the Battle of the Little Bighorn a week later.

The Cheyenne name for the battlefield, "Where The Girl Saved Her Brother", is derived from an incident during the battle, in which Buffalo Calf Road Woman, a Cheyenne woman, came to the rescue of her brother, Chief Comes in Sight, who was lying wounded on the battlefield. Her act of valor is said to have rallied the Native American forces.

See also
List of National Historic Landmarks in Montana
National Register of Historic Places listings in Big Horn County, Montana

References

External links

Rosebud Battlefield State Park Montana Fish, Wildlife & Parks
Rosebud Battlefield State Park Map Montana Fish, Wildlife & Parks

National Historic Landmarks in Montana
Protected areas of Big Horn County, Montana
State parks of Montana
Conflict sites on the National Register of Historic Places in Montana
National Register of Historic Places in Big Horn County, Montana
Great Sioux War of 1876
1876 in Montana Territory